Raipur City Rural also known as Raipur Gramin is one of the 90 Legislative Assembly constituencies of Chhattisgarh state in India. The seat has formed after the demolition of Raipur Town Vidhansabha Constituency in 2008. It is in Raipur district and is a segment of Raipur (Lok Sabha constituency).

Members of Vidhan Sabha
 As part of Madhya Pradesh Vidhan Sabha
 Before 1977 : Seat did not exist.
 1977 : Ramesh Warlyani (JNP)
 As part of Chhattisgarh Vidhan Sabha
 2013 : Satyanarayan Sharma (INC)
 2018 : Satyanarayan Sharma (INC)

Election Results

2018 Election

2013 Election
 Satyanarayan Sharma (INC) : 70,774 votes 
 Nande Sahu (BJP) : 68,913

1980 Election
 Tarunprasad (INC-I) :	20463 votes  
 Ramesh Varliyani (JNP-Secular) : 	6553

1977 Election
 Ramesh Warlyani (JNP) : 19,682 votes  
 Swarup Chand Jain (INC) : 14,429

See also
 Raipur  
Raipur district
 List of constituencies of the Chhattisgarh Legislative Assembly

References

Assembly constituencies of Chhattisgarh
Raipur district